Singarpur is a village in the Kishanganj block of Madhepura District in Bihar, India.

References

Villages in Madhepura district